HM Prison Styal is a Closed Category prison for female adults and young offenders in Styal, Cheshire, England. The prison is operated by His Majesty's Prison Service.

History
The prison occupies former buildings of the Styal Cottage Homes which opened as an orphanage for destitute children from the Manchester area in 1898. It closed in 1956 and the site re-opened as a women's prison in 1962, with women transferred from HMP Manchester.

From 1983 Styal began holding young offenders, and in 1999 a wing was added to accommodate unsentenced female prisoners following the closure of Risley's remand centre. This increased the size of the prison by 60%.

In 2003, Styal Prison was singled out as having one of the worst records for suicides in England and Wales. The Howard League for Penal Reform called for an independent inquiry into the jail, stating that bullying, drugs and overcrowding were probable causes for the high number of deaths.

In 2004, an inspection report from Her Majesty's Chief Inspector of Prisons stated that inmates at Styal Prison were being put at risk by a lack of support during drug withdrawal and with mental health problems. The report also expressed concern about the use of special cells to hold disruptive prisoners, including self-harmers. However, the report did praise the prison's staff–prisoner relations, education provision and resettlement services. The Chief Inspector also said that race relations at Styal were "among the best" she had seen.

An inspection report in 2018 found that the incidence of self-harm was high, but noted that it mainly occurred in a small number of women. The report was positive and particularly praised the prison's strategies for resettling inmates in the community on release. An average of 1.3 deaths from all causes occurred per year in inmates of the prison between 2000 and 2018.

In 2020, a woman serving an eight-month sentence gave birth to a stillborn baby in the prison toilets. Despite having alerted prison staff several times, it took several hours for the woman to receive medical attention, the prison radio system failed when an ambulance was finally attempted to be called, and no attempts to perform CPR on the baby had been made. If the prisoner had received proper medical attention, the baby might have been saved. In 2021, the prison was placed under investigation by the Prisons and Probation Ombudsman.

Deaths
Since 2001, at least eleven women have died at HMP Styal:

The prison today
Styal is a Closed Category prison for sentenced and remanded female adults and young offenders. There are also facilities for mothers with babies up to age 18 months.

The education provision at Styal is contracted out to The Manchester College. Courses  offered include hairdressing, information technology, art and design, ESOL, catering, industrial cleaning, painting & decorating, and Open University support.

Other facilities at HMP Styal include a library, gym and multi-faith chaplaincy.

A Visitors Centre is available, run by Contact Cheshire Support Group with play area and refreshments. In the main Visits Hall, facilities include a tea bar and a children's play area (also run by Contact Cheshire Support Group).

In popular culture
The prison was featured in the BBC2 documentary Women on the Edge – the Truth about Styal Prison on 27 February 2006.

Notable inmates
Notable people currently imprisoned or who were imprisoned at HMP Styal include:
Lauren Jeska, transgender fell-runner convicted of the attempted murder of Ralph Knibbs
Farzana Ahmed, mother of Shafilea Ahmed, who she murdered in 2003. Sentenced to a minimum of 25 years imprisonment in 2012
Savannah Brockhill, woman who abused and murdered her female partner's 16-month-old child, Star Hobson. Her case was widely publicised in 2021, shortly after the similarly high-profile child murder of Arthur Labinjo-Hughes by Emma Tustin. Brockhill was sentenced to a minimum of 25 years imprisonment.
 Sarah Williams, given a 25-year minimum sentence in 2016 for the murder of a woman with her friend Katrina Walsh
 Corina Smith, was sentenced to life in prison for killing her husband with a boiling mixture of water and sugar after she was told he had sexually assaulted her two children. She will serve a minimum of 12 years at HMP Styal before she can be considered for parole.
Mary Bell, stayed here for sometime in the 60s and 70s. She and another girl, Norma Joyce Bell (no relation), had murdered two young boys.

References

External links

Styal
Styal
Prisons in Cheshire
1962 establishments in England
Styal